Czech Republic–Greece relations are foreign relations between the Czech Republic and Greece.  The diplomatic relations between Greece and former Czechoslovakia were established in 1920 - after Czechoslovakia's foundation. Czech Republic and Greece established diplomatic relations on January 1, 1993.  Each country has an embassy in the other's capital. Both countries are members of the European Union, NATO, OECD, OSCE, Council of Europe and the World Trade Organization.

A Czech military contingent participated in a NATO mission to assist Greece in ensuring security during the 2004 Summer Olympics.

In December 2015 Greek diplomat Panayotis Sarris was briefly recalled from Prague to Athens due to misunderstood public statement of Czech President Miloš Zeman who spoke about the consequences of the European debt crisis.

Diplomacy

Czech Republic
Athens (Embassy) 

Republic of Greece
Prague (Embassy)

See also 
 Foreign relations of the Czech Republic
 Foreign relations of Greece
 Greeks in the Czech Republic

References

External links 
  Czech embassy in Athens
 Greek Ministry of Foreign Affairs about relations with the Czech Republic

 
Greece
Czech Republic